The Air Mobility Command Museum a military aviation museum located at Dover Air Force Base in Dover, Delaware dedicated to the history of the Air Transport Command, Military Air Transport Service, Military Airlift Command and Air Mobility Command.

History 
The origins of the museum lie in an effort that was begun in 1978 by members of the 512th Military Airlift Wing to restore an aircraft as a public relations and maintenance training project. A B-17G, Shoo Shoo Shoo Baby, was selected from a list of potential projects provided by the United States Air Force Museum and it was restored to airworthy condition over a period of ten years. Plans called for the completed airplane to be flown to the USAFM, but a significant desire existed to exhibit the history of Dover Air Force Base.

Therefore, at the direction of 436th Military Airlift Wing commander Colonel Walter Kross, planning was begun to establish a permanent historical display. The Dover AFB Historical Center was established on 13 October 1986. Only three days later, a C-47, which had previously been located at Muir Army Airfield in Pennsylvania, was airlifted to the museum.

Following official recognition as a museum by the U.S. Air Force in 1995, it became the Dover AFB Museum. This did not last long, as its name was again changed to Air Mobility Command Museum in February 1997, after it moved from three hangars in the main area of the base to its present location, Hangar 1301, in June 1996.

An exhibit on the Korean War was opened in 2000.

After being forced to close to the public in 2001, the construction of a new access road allowed the museum to reopen in 2003.

Exhibits 

In addition to the aircraft and non-aircraft collections, the museum has a few other notable attractions. These include a flight simulator, commemoration park outside the museum building, and the retired control tower cab, which served as Dover AFB's control tower from 1956 to 2009.

Collection 

The Air Mobility Command Museum is home to a number of significant vintage aircraft from a variety of eras and major commands. Additionally, the AMC Museum houses a complete set of all significant Lockheed air lifters used by the Air Force and Army since World War II. A number of the aircraft are the first, last or only examples of their model.

 Beechcraft C-45G Expeditor 51-11795
 Bell UH-1N Iroquois 69-15475
 Boeing B-17G Flying Fortress 44-83624
 Boeing KB-50J Superfortress 49-0389
 Boeing KC-97L Stratofreighter 53-230
 Boeing KC-135E Stratotanker 57-1507
 Boeing-Stearman PT-17 Kaydet
 Cessna U-3 58-2126
 Convair C-131D Samaritan 55-295
 Convair F-106A Delta Dart 59-0023
 de Havilland Canada C-7A Caribou 63-9760
 Douglas A-26C Invader 44-35523
 Douglas C-47A Skytrain 42-92841 "Turf & Sport Special"
 Douglas C-54M Skymaster 44-9030
 Douglas C-124A Globemaster II 49-0258
 Douglas C-133B Cargomaster 59-0536
 Fairchild C-119C Flying Boxcar 48-0352
 Fairchild C-119G Flying Boxcar RCAF 22118
 Fairchild C-123K Provider 54-0658
 Kaman HH-43B Huskie 62-4532
 Laister-Kauffman TG-4A 42-53078
 Lockheed C-5A Galaxy 69-0014
 Lockheed C-60 Lodestar
 Lockheed C-130E Hercules 69-6580
 Lockheed C-141A Starlifter 61-2775
 Lockheed C-141B Starlifter 64-0626
 Lockheed L-1049E Super Constellation c/n 4557
 Lockheed T-33A 52-9497
 McDonnell F-101B Voodoo 59-0428
 McDonnell Douglas C-9A Nightingale 67-22584
 McDonnell Douglas KC-10 Extender 79-0433
 McDonnell Douglas VC-9C 73-1682
 Vultee BT-13 Valiant 42-1639
 Waco CG-4A 45-15009

See also
 List of United States Air Force museums

References

Footnotes

Notes

External links 

 

Air force museums in the United States